The Edinburgh Lions are a basketball club based in the city of Edinburgh, Scotland. Both the Men's and the Women's teams compete in the Scottish Basketball Championship, the highest level in Scotland and second tier of British basketball. The Lions also have two more Men's teams and a second Women's team, which all compete in the Lothian Basketball League.

Men
The Men's Lions team play in Division 1 of the Scottish Basketball Championship, the top-tier basketball league in Scotland. The team was promoted to National League Division 1 at the start of the 2018–19 season, after winning the 2017–18 Division 2 Playoff title and many successful years in the regional Lothian Basketball League, which they won in the 2011–12 season.

Honours
 National League Division 2 Winners: 2018
 Lothian League Winners: 2012

Season-by-season records

2022–23 Men's team Roster

Women
After several years of being one of the top teams in the Lothian League and three seasons of sweeping all regional titles, the Lions Women's team also moved on to participate in the Scottish Basketball Championship for the first time in the 2022-23 season.

Honours
 Lothian League Winners: 2016, 2019, 2020, 2022
 Lothian Cup Winners: 2019, 2022

Season-by-season records

Club records
Most points in a single game - Jeb Spink, 35
All-time leading points scorer - Nick Scott, 832

External links

Basketball teams in Scotland
Sports teams in Edinburgh
2006 establishments in Scotland
Basketball teams established in 2006